Slanguage is a vocabulary of slang.

Slanguage may also refer to:

Slanguage, a jargon used by Variety magazine's writers
Slanguage (album), by Daddy Kev
Slanguage (artist collective), an artist collective in Los Angeles, California
SLanguages, a conference about language education in Virtual Worlds